Western Norway Pharmaceutical Trust is a health trust owned by Western Norway Regional Health Authority that operates four hospital pharmacies at Haukeland University Hospital in Bergen, Stavanger Hospital, Haugesund Hospital and Førde Hospital. The pharmacies are part of the Ditt Apotek chain and use Norsk Medisinaldepot as wholesaler.

Pharmacies of Norway
Retail companies of Norway
Health trusts of Norway
Companies based in Bergen
Norwegian companies established in 2002